The Cabinet of Jóhann Hafstein in Iceland was formed 10 July 1970.

Cabinets

Inaugural cabinet: 10 July 1970 – 10 October 1970

Reshuffle: 10 October 1970 – 14 July 1971
Auður Auðuns replaced Jóhann Hafstein as Minister of Justice and Ecclesiastical Affairs.

See also
Government of Iceland
Cabinet of Iceland

References

Johann Hafstein, Cabinet of
Johann Hafstein, Cabinet of
Johann Hafstein, Cabinet of
Cabinets established in 1970
Cabinets disestablished in 1971
Independence Party (Iceland)